Marco Piva, Italian architect, interior designer and product designer, born on February 15, 1952, in Milan.

Biography
He graduated in architecture at Politecnico di Milano and founded STUDIODADA in 1977, that was one of the main design offices of the radical period.

In 1990, he opens his own brand, Studio Marco Piva, with activities ranging from large architectural projects for tourist facilities, to interior design, masterplan, and finally industrial design.

From 1987 to 1990, he was member of the Presidential Board of Associazione per il Disegno Industriale (ADI).
In 1987, Marco Piva also founded IDA, International Design Agency, an Italian interface for a World Design Network system.

In 2001, a variety of experiences in strategic consulting in the field of design and hotel hospitality culminated in consulting with the hospitality division of Federlegno. In 2002, “Atelier Design” was established, the Studio's atelier which was
created as a centre for industrial design research and development.

Meantime, this remarkable activity has been combined with teaching positions at universities and design institutes both in Italy and abroad, and the organisation of the post-graduate master's degree program at the Politecnico di Milano the Polytechnic School of Design and the Istituto Europeo di Design in Milan.

Major works
 Osaka Gas Corporation Ltd. “Building”– Osaka, interior design, 1992-1994
 Hotel Carrobbio – Milano, Interior Design, 1997-1999
 Eurocongressi Hotel – Cavaion, Verona Interior Design, 1998-2000
 Starhotel Michelangelo – Firenze, Inteior Design, 1998-2000
 Hotel dei Cavalieri Milano, (7th floor and meeting rooms interior design, 2000-2002) 
 Laguna Palace Hotel – Venezia, Architettura & Interior Design, 2000-2002
 Hotel Mirage – Kazan, Russia Architecture & Interior Design, 2001-2003
 Port Palace Monaco – Principato di Monaco, Interior Design, 2002-2004
 T Hotel Cagliari, 2003-2005
 Club Med – Caprera, Master Plan Concept, 2006
 Porto Dubai – Dubai, Master Plan, 2006
 Tiara Hotel – Dubai, Interior Design, 2006-2010
 Hotel Residence Le Terrazze – Villorba, Architettura, 2006-2011
 Move Hotel – Mogliano Veneto Architettura, Interior & Light Design, 2009-2011
 Complessi residenziali a Milano progettati con Zaha Hadid e Daniel Libeskind, 2010-2013
 Beijing Feng-Tai Financial District – Concept design, Master Plan, 2011
 Rawdhat Residential Buildings – Abu Dhabi, 2012
 Hotel Excelsior Gallia – Milan, Architecture, Landscape, Lighting, Interior Design, 2010-2015
 Casa Alitalia lounges – Milan Malpensa - Fiumicino Airport, 2016 
 Pantheon Iconic Hotel – Rome, Interior Design, 2018 
 La Suite Hotel – Matera, Interior Design, 2019
Palazzo del Touring Club Italiano, Milano, 2021
Palazzo Nani, Venezia, 2021
 Tonino Lamborghini Towers – Chengdu, China Interior Design - on going
 Princype Residential Complex – Milan, Italy Architecture & Interior Fit out - on going

Awards and acknowledgement
 Triennale – Milan
 Landesgewerbemt Museum – Stuttgart
 Design Center – Cologne
 Kortrijk Design Biennale Interieur – Kortrijk
 European Community Design Prize – Seville
 Una Camera per l’Europa – Genoa
 Contract World Award – Hannover
 The European Hotel Design Awards - London
 Hospitality Award 2009 – Innovation 
 Best Communicator Award, Marmomacc 2010, Verona
 ADI Design Index 2011 for the design of MGM Furnari
World Travel Awards for the Excelsior Hotel Gallia, 2015-2016-2017-2018-2019-2020
 Good Design Award, 2017, ZEIT handle for Mandelli1953
 ADI Index, 2017, Category “Exhibition”, Designing the Complexity
 IF Design Award, 2018, Book radiator design Marco Piva for Caleido
 China Awards 2018, Capital Elite award for the urban development in China 
 Wallpaper (magazine) Design Awards, 2019, Dream Factory category, Marty, Visionnaire
 Luxury Lifestyle Awards, 2020, category “Best Luxury Architect and Interior Design Studios in Milan, Italy”

Main exhibitions
 Light Hours - Salon du Meuble, Paris
 Marco Piva Designs for Tomorrow – Host, Milan
 Design Bar,  Il Caos Felice – Sia Guest, Rimini
 Sicis Teatro, L’arte dell’abitare tra materia e luce – CRT Teatro dell’Arte, Milan, 2006
 Marco Piva Notebook Design Party – Teatro dell’Arte, I Saloni 2008, Milano
 Interni Design Energies – Limitless Color Tower – "University of Milan"
 Beauty Cave – Interni Think Tank – Università degli Studi di Milano
 La mano del Designer – disegni di Marco Piva – Villa Necchi Campiglio – Triennale Bovisa, Milano
 Marmomacc Meets Design “Irregolare Eccezionale” – Marmomacc 2010, Verona Fiere
 Tron Designs Corian – Milan Furniture Fair 2011

Product design

 A Project
 Altreforme
 Arflex
 Arpa
 Bross Italia
 Corinto

 Deko Collezioni 
 Ege
 Iradium
 Jacuzzi 
 La Murrina 
 Leucos

 Meritalia
 Moroso
 Novello
 Pedrali 
 Potacco
 Rapsel

 Reflex
 Rubinetterie Stella 
 Uno Più
 Vda 
 Valpra
 Zonca

References

External links
 Marco Piva Official website
 Tharaa Holding unveils Hadara brand & signature projects by Marco Piva
 Project Concepts
 Marco Piva CV on Edilportale 
 Marco Piva as Marble Designer: a gallery

Italian designers
1952 births
Polytechnic University of Milan alumni
Living people
Italian furniture designers
Italian industrial designers
Architects from Milan
Academic staff of the Polytechnic University of Milan